Alejandro Peñaranda Trujillo (4 November 1993 – 1 June 2018) was a Colombian professional footballer who played as a striker.

Career
Born in Jamundí, Peñaranda played for Atlético Nacional, América de Cali and Cortuluá.

Death
Peñaranda was shot and killed on 1 June 2018, while at the house of Cristian Alexis Borja, who was unharmed. Peñaranda's Cortuluá teammate Heissen Izquierdo was injured in the attack.

References

1993 births
2018 deaths
Colombian footballers
Atlético Nacional footballers
América de Cali footballers
Cortuluá footballers
Categoría Primera A players
Categoría Primera B players
Association football forwards
People from Jamundí
Male murder victims
Deaths by firearm in Colombia
Colombian murder victims
People murdered in Colombia
Sportspeople from Valle del Cauca Department